A lingam massage is a type of massage that primarily focuses on the male genitalia.

Some therapy-based analysts have discussed the link between lingam massage practitioners and claims of alleviation of genital desensitization such as death-grip syndrome.

In the Tantric philosophy, the lingam (genital organ) is viewed with the utmost respect and affection, as it is believed to hold a significant amount of sexual energy. During a lingam massage, pleasure is slowly and steadily increased, which may lead to a climax of multiple orgasms.

References

Massage therapy